There have been 54 mayors of St. Petersburg, Florida. David Moffett was the city's first mayor. The current mayor is Ken Welch.

Architect Randolph Wedding was the city's mayor from 1973 until 1975. Corinne Freeman served as the city's first female mayor and governed from 1977 until 1985. Republican 
Richard M. Baker  led the city from 2001 until 2010. He was succeeded by Bill Foster, who served until 2014.

List of mayors

References

External links
Mayor Rick Kriseman

St. Petersburg, Florida

History of St. Petersburg, Florida